Five ships of the Chilean Navy have been named after the Mapuche leader Colo Colo:

 Colo Colo (1830), a brigantine of 140 t formerly named Flora
  (1880), a  torpedo boat of 5 or 30 tons which was transported to the Titicaca Lake during the War of the Pacific
 , (ATA 73) a tug of 760 t, now a museum ship in Punta Arenas
 Colo Colo (1972), a tug, formerly RAM Lenga

See also
 List of decommissioned ships of the Chilean Navy
 Colocolo (disambiguation)

Colo Colo, Chilean ship